Brain Stimulation is a bimonthly peer-reviewed medical journal covering the field of neuromodulation. It was established in 2008 and is published by Elsevier. The editor-in-chief is Mark S. George (Medical University of South Carolina). It publishes original research, reviews, and editorials covering various modalities of neuromodulation such as transcranial magnetic stimulation, electrical deep brain stimulation, transcranial direct-current stimulation, ultrasound neuromodulation, and optogenetics.

Abstracting and indexing 
The journal is abstracted and indexed in:

According to the Journal Citation Reports, the journal has a 2018 impact factor of 6.919.

References

External links 
 

Neurology journals
Elsevier academic journals
Bimonthly journals
Hybrid open access journals
English-language journals
Publications established in 2008